1983 was a common year in the Gregorian calendar.

1983 or '83 may also refer to:

Music
 1983 (album), a 2006 album by Flying Lotus
 "1983", a 2010 album by Sophie Hunger
 "1983" (song), a 2010 song by Neon Trees
 "1983... (A Merman I Should Turn to Be)", a song by The Jimi Hendrix Experience

Other uses
 1983 (film), a 2014 Indian film by Abrid Shine
 '83 (film), a 2021 Indian cricket film
 1983 (TV series), a 2018 Netflix series
 Civil Rights Act of 1871, later amended and placed in U.S. Code as Section 1983
 The Bite of 83 (1983), a piece of lore in the video game Five Nights at Freddy's